Ursus SA (often stylized URSUS SA) is a Polish agricultural machinery manufacturer, headquartered in Lublin, Poland. The company was founded in Warsaw in 1893, and has strong historic roots regarding Polish tractor production history. It has also carried out some production of trolleybuses in a joint venture with the Ukrainian manufacturer Bogdan, and manufactures buses, coaches, and trolleybuses in a joint venture with AMZ Kutno under the name Ursus Bus.

History

Early history 

The Ursus Factory was founded in Poland in 1893 on 15 Sienna Street, Warsaw, by three engineers and four businessmen. It began producing exhaust engines and then later trucks and metal fittings intended for the Russian Tsar.

In 1930, the Ursus factory fell on hard times due to the world financial crisis and was nationalised under the  Państwowe Zakłady Inżynieryjne (National Engineering Works, PZInż), the Polish manufacturer of arms and vehicles. It then began producing military tractors, tanks and other heavy machinery for troops. During the German occupation of Poland in World War II the factory was controlled by FAMO and produced Panzer II, Marder II and Wespe AFVs. After the war, the Ursus Factory started producing the Ursus C-45, a copy of the German pre-war Lanz Bulldog tractor. During the 1950s, the Ursus factory began producing tractors using a Zetor-based design.

By 1961, there was a growing need for tractors in Poland, but the tractors produced by the Ursus factory did not meet the needs of Polish agriculture.  A bilateral agreement was created between Poland and Czechoslovakia, where Czechoslovakia would provide the Ursus factory with the parts necessary to enlarge and modernise the factory and in exchange, Poland would supply Czechoslovak factories with raw materials.  The goal was to construct a joint tractor industry where Poland and Czechoslovakia would combine to produce 120,000 tractors per year, as in 1963 Poland was only producing 15,000.

Solidarity
Workers of the Ursus tractor factory played a large role in the solidarity movement in the 1970s and 1980s. On 25 June 1976 in response to a rise in food prices, the workers of Ursus, acting in solidarity with workers in Radom and many other areas, went on strike and blocked and destroyed parts of the main east-west and north-south rail lines leaving Warsaw. This was one of the largest and most disruptive strikes that occurred that day, and resulted in the prime minister announcing on television the withdrawal of the food price increase.

In 1980, workers of the Ursus factory went on strike and spent the night at the factory to protest the detention of Jan Narozniak, a volunteer printing worker at the Warsaw chapter of Solidarity.  Also in 1980, 16,000 workers threatened to stop coming to work on Saturdays in order to self-enforce the 5-day work week proclaimed by the Solidarity movement.  In 1988, 200 workers in the Ursus factory occupied the plant canteen and demanded that the management petition for increased wages, the release of imprisoned workers, and the legalisation of Solidarity and the Independent Students' Association.

Investment under Gierek
The Ursus factory was the focus of an extensive investment initiative in the 1970s under Edward Gierek. Under this programme, large loans were taken from western banks for the purpose of importing modern equipment and methods that would cause expansion of Polish industry and growth of the Polish economy.  In 1977, a 7.9 million dollar export-import bank loan and a 7 million dollar loan from private American banks were granted to the Ursus tractor factory for the purpose of purchasing machine tools from the Ingersoll Milling Machine Company of Rockford, Illinois, and Gleason Works in Rochester, New York.  However, such investment programmes became inefficient and failed, leaving Poland with an immense debt.

By 1980, 25 billion dollars were locked into inefficient, unfinished projects in Polish industry that were speculated to require an additional 50 billion dollars to complete. The Ursus Tractor Factory was one of the largest victims of this problem. By 1981, equipment that had been purchased in the West at the Ursus Factory amounted to 3,600 million złoty.  Warehouse space at Ursus was filled with unused, unnecessary supplies, e.g. a stock of 1.6 million rarely used screws, and since construction of new warehouse space had stopped, other supplies were left to deteriorate outside.  Gierek had invested nearly 1 billion dollars into a project of developing a modern Massey Ferguson model of tractor at Ursus, however due to licensing problems, these tractors could not be sold in the Western Bloc during the Cold War for political reasons, and in the Eastern Bloc neither because they were too expensive. Instead of the targeted production of 75,000 tractors per year, only 500 were made.

Recent history

Ursus' tractor production declined throughout the 1990s, falling from 60,000 tractors per year in 1980 to about 16,000 tractors in 1995.  The decline in production was due to the enormous debt that Ursus had contracted as a result of its expansion programme in the 1980s.  The need to repay the debt blocked access to funds needed for the daily operations of the factory. In 1996, 550 million złoty, 80% of Ursus’ debt, owed to nearly 700 creditors, was written off. Tractor sales continued to decline to an all-time low of 1,578 units in 2006.

URSUS Company was established in the years 1998–2003 as a consequence of restructuring and cooperation of PHZ "Bumar" Ltd., ZPC URSUS SA and Ursus Tractor Factory Ltd.
The company is still producing Ursus tractors. Bumar Ltd became the main shareholder of Ursus Company, leading to Ursus becoming part of Bumar Industrial Group, which is marketing Ursus products both on foreign and domestic markets.

In 2007, Uzel Holding of Turkey announced they were buying 51% of Ursus.  Both Uzel and Ursus are, or were, licensees of AGCO's Massey Ferguson. In 2008 it was announced that Uzel had not kept up to its commitments, and TAFE and Pol-Mot were interested in buying.

In 2011 Pol-Mot bought the Ursus Company from Bumar Ltd. Recently, the company is expanding its business in Central Europe and other countries, as well as planning to produce electric buses.

In 2013, a joint venture between Ursus and the Ukrainian company Bogdan received an order for 38 trolleybuses for the Lublin, Poland, trolleybus system.  The body-and-chassis shells were completed by Bogdan and shipped to an Ursus plant in Lublin, where Ursus would install the axles, electrical propulsion equipment (supplied by Cegelec), seats and other fittings, to complete the vehicles. The first of the 38 Urbus/Bogdan trolleybuses, officially designated as model Ursus T70116, was delivered in mid-2013, and the last were delivered in mid-2015.

Ursus signed an agreement worth USD 10 million in 2014 to deliver 3000 tractors to Ethiopia

Models 
 Ursus 1921/1922
 Ursus C-45
 Ursus C-308
 Ursus C-325
 Ursus C-328
 Ursus C-330/Ursus C-330M
 Ursus C-335/Ursus C-335M
 Ursus C-4011
 Ursus C-350/Ursus C-355
 Ursus C-360/Ursus C-360-3P
 Ursus C-362
 Ursus C-380/Ursus C-380M
 Ursus C-382
 Ursus C-385/Ursus C-385A
 Ursus C-392
 Ursus C-3102
 Ursus C-3110
 Ursus 902/Ursus 904
 Ursus 932/Ursus 934
 Ursus 1002 / 1004
 Ursus 1032 / 1034
 Ursus 1042 / 1044
 Ursus 1132 / 1134
 Ursus 1154
 Ursus 1201/
 Ursus 1204
 Ursus 1222 / 1224
 Ursus 1232 / 1234
 Ursus 1434
 Ursus 1614
 Ursus 1634
 Ursus 1654
 Ursus 1674
 Ursus 1734
 Ursus 1934
 Ursus 1954
 Ursus 2802
 Ursus 2812
 Ursus 3502/4502
 Ursus 3512/3514
 Ursus 3702
 Ursus 3722/3724
 Ursus 3822/3824
 Ursus 4022/4024
 Ursus 4512/4514
 Ursus 4822/4824
 Ursus 5024/6024
 Ursus 5044
 Ursus 5312/5314
 Ursus 5322/5324
 Ursus 5524
 Ursus 5714
 Ursus 6012/6014
 Ursus 6614
 Ursus 6824
 Ursus 7524
 Ursus 8024
 Ursus 8034
 Ursus 8014 H
 Ursus 9014 H
 Ursus 10014 H
 Ursus 11024
 Ursus U-4150

Prototypes
 Ursus C-336
 Ursus C-342
 Ursus C-330 3P
 Ursus C-355P
 Ursus C-355D
 Ursus C-356
 Ursus 202
 Ursus 944
 Ursus 1242/1244
 Ursus 1414S
 Ursus 4504
 Ursus 6424
 Ursus U-310
 Ursus U-510
 Ursus U-610
 Ursus U-710
 Ursus 14034
 Ursus 11034
 Ursus 10014T

See also 
 Ursus Bus

References

Sources
 Open Society Archive
 https://web.archive.org/web/20080106191927/http://files.osa.ceu.hu/holdings/300/8/3/text/41-4-120.shtml
 https://web.archive.org/web/20080106191952/http://files.osa.ceu.hu/holdings/300/8/3/text/46-1-243.shtml
 https://web.archive.org/web/20080106191931/http://files.osa.ceu.hu/holdings/300/8/3/text/44-6-190.shtml
 https://web.archive.org/web/20080106191946/http://files.osa.ceu.hu/holdings/300/8/3/text/45-4-220.shtml
 The Warsaw Voice
 http://www.warsawvoice.pl/archiwum.phtml/2713/
 Poland Business Network
 https://web.archive.org/web/20070927175626/http://www.polandbusinessnetwork.pl/news/index.php?contentid=140152
 Time Magazine
 Time (magazine)

External links 
  
 Website of enthusiasts of Ursus plants 
 Ursus video clip collection
 Photo gallery of the abandoned halls

Agricultural machinery manufacturers of Poland
Tractor manufacturers of Poland
Trolleybus manufacturers
Bus manufacturers of Poland
Electric vehicle manufacturers of Poland
Polish brands
Manufacturing companies established in 1893
Manufacturing companies based in Warsaw